Curse of the Golden Vampire was a collaborative music project of Alec Empire and Techno Animal (Kevin Martin and Justin Broadrick). The group released a studio album, titled The Curse of the Golden Vampire, on Digital Hardcore Recordings in 1998. Without the participation of Empire, the group released a studio album, titled Mass Destruction, on Ipecac Recordings in 2003.

Discography

Studio albums
 The Curse of the Golden Vampire (1998)
 Mass Destruction (2003)

The Curse of the Golden Vampire

The Curse of the Golden Vampire is the first studio album by The Curse of the Golden Vampire. It was released on Digital Hardcore Recordings in 1998.

Critical reception

John Bush of AllMusic called the album "a distinct disappointment." He added, "The Curse of the Golden Vampire takes each act's trademark -- industrial breakbeats and darkside dub soundscapes, respectively -- and merely blends them together, resulting in a project which sounds as though separate studios were used for recording."

Track listing

Personnel
Credits adapted from liner notes.

 Alec Empire – music
 Techno Animal – additional music, production
 Beans – vocals (3)
 Steve Rooke – mastering
 Hell – cover art
 The Pathological Puppy – cover art

References

External links
 
 Curse of the Golden Vampire at Ipecac Recordings

Digital hardcore music groups
Ipecac Recordings artists
1998 debut albums
Alec Empire albums